Hamdard University is a private research university with campuses in Karachi and Islamabad, Pakistan. It was founded in 1991 by the renowned philanthropist Hakim Said of the Hamdard Foundation. It is one of the first and oldest private institutions of higher education in Pakistan, and is the largest private research university in Karachi, with a campus area of over 350 acres.

Hamdard University's central library Bait-ul-Hikmah is one of the largest research libraries in South Asia with a collection of over half a million books, some of them dating back to the 17th century. The university includes eight faculties, nine research institutes, three teaching hospitals, and three affiliated engineering institutes. There are more than 15,000 alumni of Hamdard University employed in organisations in Pakistan and worldwide.

Recognition
Major programs of Hamdard University are accredited by and offered in collaboration with bodies such as the Higher Education Commission (HEC), Pakistan Engineering Council (PEC), Pakistan Medical and Dental Council (PMDC), Pakistan Bar Council (PBC), National Telecommunication Corporation (NTC), and the Pakistan Pharmacy Council (PCP).

History

Hamdard University was established on 9 October 1991, by a provisional act of the Sindh Assembly. The founding chancellor, Hakim Said, had been long advocating for the establishment of private-sector higher education learning institutions. He received the university's charter from then-President Ghulam Ishaq Khan in a solemn ceremony. The university is named after Said's philanthropy and education lobby organisation, the Hamdard Foundation.

An area of about 178 acres was earmarked at Madinat al-Hikmah: "a City of Education, Science, and Culture" in Bund Murad neighborhood of Gadap Town in Karachi.

Stretching over an area of 350 acres, Madinat al-Hikmah includes, in addition to the establishments of the university, Hamdard Garden, sports stadium, Hamdard Public School and college, operating as its earliest institutions, imparting education from primary to higher secondary level, and Bait al-Hikmah library. The Institute of Education & Social Sciences (HIESS) and College of Eastern Medicine (HACEM) were among the earliest institutions established. The other institutions that appeared in the later stages include Hamdard College of Medicine & Dentistry (HCM&D), Hamdard Institute of Management Sciences (HIMS), Hamdard Institute of Engineering Technology (HIET), Faculty of Engineering Sciences and Technology (FEST), Usman Institute of Technology (UIT), Hafiz Mohammad Ilyas Institute of Pharmacology & Herbal Sciences, Hamdard School of Law (HSL), Hamdard Institute of Pharmaceutical Sciences (HIPS), Bait al-Hikmah Institute of Research, and Regional CISCO Networking Academy.

In 1996, the first city campus of the university was established at Adamjee Nagar. Later on, another city campus operating weekend and evening programs was started in PECHS, Karachi. The number of campuses increased with the establishment of Islamabad and Faisalabad campuses in 1998 and 2000 respectively. During the period, five Lahore-, Islamabad- and Karachi-based organisations, imparting professional education, became affiliated with the university.

Campuses
Hamdard University has four major campuses in two main cities of Pakistan: three in Karachi (the financial hub of Pakistan) and one in Islamabad – the capital city.

Karachi campuses
Out of the three campuses in Karachi, the one at Northern Bypass is the oldest and the largest. It is known as the Main Campus. The others are in downtown Karachi and are known as the City Campuses.

Main campus

The Main Campus houses institutes and faculties which include Hamdard Institute of Information Technology, Hamdard Institute of Management Sciences, Faculty of Eastern Medicine, Faculty of Health and Medical Sciences, Faculty of Environmental Sciences, Faculty of Humanities, Faculty of Pharmacy, and Social Sciences.

City campuses (old)
Previously there were two major City Campuses, in addition to the Main Campus, in Karachi:
 City Campus I (CC-I) – SNPA 30, Kathiawar Hall, "B" Block, Adamjee Nagar, off Tipu Sultan Road, Karachi
 City Campus II (CC-II) – 164-G, Block 3, off Khalid Bin Waleed Road, PECHS, Karachi
CC-I is basically an extension for the Hamdard Institute of Management Sciences (HIMS) and CC-II is the campus of Hamdard Institute of Engineering Technology (HIET), and is used to offer training courses, certifications and diplomas. It houses the Graduate School of Engineering Sciences and Information Technology and Hamdard School of Law. A summer semester, for the students who want to improve their grades or apply for the courses which they previously failed to complete/pass, is offered at CC-II during July–September, every year.

City campus (new) 
 Address: Plot No. 4A, Block 6, Adjacent Delhi Sweets PECHS, Nursery Stop, Main Sharhrah-e-Faisal, Karachi.

Islamabad campuses
Hamdard University Islamabad main campus Madinat al Hikmat is located at Kuri Road Islamabad which is spread over an area of 10 acres. Hamdard University Islamabad also has a city campus in Blue Area near China Chowk. The Islamabad campus started its operations in the year 1998 in a small building in F8. The Islamabad Campus houses three institutes which offer disciplines in Engineering, IT, Management Sciences, and Pharmaceutical Sciences. These institutes include Hamdard Institute of Engineering and Technology, Hamdard Institute of Management Sciences, and Hamdard Institute of Pharmaceutical Sciences. Islamabad Campus offers facilities for students and faculty-members which include an auditorium, wireless Internet access, hospital training for Pharm.D. students, a student-teacher centre, and laboratories.

Hamdard Institute of Pharmacy and Hamdard Institute of Management Sciences have been shifted to the main Campus Madinat Ul Hikmat in May 2019 whereas Hamdard Institute of Engineering and Technology will shift later this year.

 Hamdard Institute of Information Technology, 23- West, Fazal-ul-Haq Road, Blue Area, Islamabad. Phone: +92-51-260 4391-2
 Hamdard Institute of Management Sciences, 23- East, Fazal-ul-Haq Road, Blue Area. * Hamdard Institute of Pharmaceutical Sciences, 23- East, Fazal-ul-Haq Road, Blue Area.

Faculties and institutes
Hamdard University offers undergraduate and post-graduate education through its institutions/faculties which are based on the campus.

Faculty of Engineering Sciences and Technology
FEST (Faculty of Engineering Sciences and Technology), headed by Dean, Prof. Dr. Vali Uddin, offers its bachelor's, master's, and doctorate degrees through its three institutions: GSESIT, HIET – Karachi and HIET – Islamabad.

GSESIT
The Graduate School of Engineering Sciences and Information Technology was established in 1997 with the name of Hamdard Institute of Information Technology (HIIT). Later on, due to its main focus on graduate programs, it was renamed the Graduate School of Engineering Sciences and Information Technology (GSESIT). Initially, Master of Sciences in Information Technology – MS (IT) was offered with the inception of the institute. In fall 2002, Master of Science in Software Engineering – MS (SE) program was introduced. Recently, new Masters, M.Phil., and PhD degree programs are being offered to take an active part in research and development and to concentrate toward the area of specialisation, and the institute is catering to the needs of professionals through short courses, certificates, and diploma programs. The IEEE Student Branch was also established at GSESIT (STB62211) to create research and innovation activities.

GSESIT offers the following graduate and research programs:

Master of Sciences/Philosophy:
M.E. (Electronic Engineering)
M.E. (Telecommunication Engineering)
M.E. (Energy Engineering)
M.E. (Control & Automation)
M.E. (Signal Processing)
M.S. (Information Technology)
M.S. (Software Engineering)
M.S. (Telecommunications)
M.Phil. (Environmental Sciences)

Doctorate/mscellaneous programs:
PhD (Environmental Sciences)
PhD (Computer Sciences)
PhD (Computer Engineering)
PhD (Electrical Engineering)
PhD (Electronics Engineering)
PhD (Information Technology)
PhD (Telecommunication Engineering)
PhD (Software Engineering)
 Other certifications and short courses such as CCNA, Java, and Web programming, etc.

HIET – Karachi
Hamdard Institute of Engineering Technology, Karachi was established in 1997 at the Main Campus. Initially it offered graduate programmes only. Later on, the graduate studies were offered under the institute of GSESIT and HIET – Karachi was dedicated for the bachelor's programs only. The institute offers the following programs:

Bachelor of Engineering:
B.E. (Bio-Medical Engineering)
B.E. (Computer-Systems Engineering)
B.E. (Electrical Engineering)
B.E. (Electronics Engineering)
B.E. (Energy Engineering)
B.E. (Industrial Engineering)
B.E. (Mechanical Engineering)
B.E. (Telecommunication Engineering)
B.E. (Polymer Engineering)
B.E. (Textile Engineering)
Bachelor of Science:
B.S. (Computer Science)
B.S. (Software Engineering)
B.S. (Multimedia Technology)
B.S. (Information Technology) – Evening Shift
B.S. (Telecommunications & Networking)

The faculty for HIET – Karachi includes six professors, six associate professors, 24 assistant professors, 12 lecturers, 20 laboratory engineers and few members of visiting/adjunct faculty. As of 25 July 2013, the Director of Hamdard Institute of Engineering Technology is Prof. Dr. Pervez Akhtar.

HIET – Islamabad
Hamdard Institute of Information Technology, Islamabad is a constituent institute of Hamdard University, Islamabad Campus which came into being with the establishment of Islamabad Campus in 2000. HIET – Islamabad initially offered Bachelor of Science (B.S.) programs in Computer Science, Information Technology and Computer-Systems Engineering. Then, the institute introduced Engineering programs in Telecommunications and Electronics in 2003. On the advice of PEC, the two engineering programs (T.E. and E.E.) were merged to form one program as B.E. (Electrical Engineering). This was applicable from the intake of 2007 and onwards. The institute is thus offering B.E. (Electrical Engineering) with two streams, i.e., Telecommunications and Electronics. Pakistan Engineering Council has granted conditional accreditation to the engineering programs of HUIC for the intakes of 2004, 2005 and 2006, for Telecommunications and Electronics Engineering programs. The institution offers the following programs:
B.E. (Electrical Engineering)
B.S. (Computer Science)

The teaching faculty for HUIC includes four professors, seven assistant professors, 16 lecturers and 11 members from visiting faculty. Laboratories for the campus include a Research Laboratory, an Electronics Laboratory, a Communications Laboratory, an Industrial Control Laboratory and a Simulation & Modelling Laboratory.

Faculty of Environmental Sciences
The Faculty of Environmental Sciences offers the degree of Bachelor of Science in Environment & Energy Management.

Faculty of Management Sciences
The Faculty of Management Sciences offers the degrees of Bachelor and Master of Business Administration (B.B.A. & M.B.A.) and M.S. (Management Sciences) through its two constituent institutes: HIMS – Karachi and HIMS – Islamabad.

HIMS – Karachi

Hamdard Institute of Management Sciences Karachi offers a four-year program of B.B.A. (Bachelor of Business Administration) in undergraduate category, an M.S. (Management Sciences) program, and a post-graduate M.B.A. (Master of Business Administration) program which has been divided into four categories with respect to the time-span and previous education:
 A -year MBA plan for students with a previous two-year bachelor's degree in any discipline,
 A regular two-year MBA plan for students having a four-year bachelor's degree in any discipline,
 A -year MBA plan for students with a four-year bachelor's degree in business administration (BBA) or equivalent,
 An executive two-year MBA plan for students having a two-year bachelor's degree in any discipline and a professional experience of at least four years in an executive capacity.

City Campus – I is an extension to the Institute of Management Sciences, Karachi. The teaching faculty of HIMS – Karachi and City Campus – I includes three professors, three associate professors, 16 assistant professors, seven lecturers, and two research associates.

HIMS – Islamabad
Hamdard Institute of Management Sciences, Islamabad offers B.B.A. (Bachelor of Business Administration) in undergraduate category and post-graduate M.B.A. (Master of Business Administration) programs, similar to those offered by the HIMS – Karachi.

The faculty at HIMS includes three professors, three assistant professors, six lecturers, two teaching assistants, and nine members from visiting faculty.

Faculty of Humanities and Social Sciences
The Faculty of Humanities and Social Sciences was inaugurated in 1992. It offers its degrees through Hamdard Institute of Education and Social Sciences (HIESS), which was established as the first constituent institution of Hamdard University's Main Campus. The institution's mission, as described on the official site, is "the production of the unconventional, capable, dynamic, creative, democratic, and innovative teacher". HIESS offers the degree of Bachelor of Education (BEd).

The teaching faculty of Hamdard Institute of Education and Social Sciences (HIESS) consists of one associate professor (the acting director), two assistant professors, two lecturers, and a research associate.

Faculty of Eastern Medicine

The Faculty of Eastern Medicine provides education in the field of herbal medicine, which continues to be practised in many of the Islamic countries today. The countries where it has, to some extent, enjoyed an official status are India, Pakistan, Bangladesh, Sri Lanka, and South Africa. In Pakistan, in the mid-sixties, the government under the then-president ordered the official registration of "Hakims".

The Faculty of Eastern Medicine was established "[to] produce graduates with knowledge of Eastern Medicine with the latest technology for diagnosis and modern methods for the management of diseases and health care". Hamdard Research Institute of Unani Medicine (H.R.I.U.M.) was included in the Faculty of Eastern Medicine as approved by the Academic Council held on 24 April 2008. Currently, the faculty offers the following degrees:
 Bachelor of Eastern Medicine and Surgery (Regular five years)
 Bachelor of Eastern Medicine and Surgery (Condensed Three years)
 M.Phil. and PhD programs are offered on a regular basis.

The degree programs offered by the faculty are accredited by the National Council of Tibb, Ministry of Health – Government of Pakistan and by the Higher Education Commission, Islamabad. Most of the B.E.M.S. graduates start their own practice by establishing their clinics. Others are employed in hospitals and research institutes and organizations such as Hamdard Foundation and Hamdard Laboratories, Pakistan, Ibn-e-Sina Institute for Tibb, the University of Western Cape, South Africa, and Qarshi Industries, Pakistan.

The teaching staff of the Faculty of Eastern Medicine consists of five professors, nine assistant professors, nine lecturers, three MOs (Medical Officers), and an RMO (Resident Medical Officer).

Faculty of Health and Medical Sciences 
The Faculty of Health and Medical Sciences offers the degrees of Bachelor of Medicine & Bachelor of Surgery (M.B.B.S.) and Bachelor of Dental Surgery (B.D.S.).

The Hamdard College of Medicine & Dentistry (H.C.M.D) is recognized by the Pakistan Medical & Dental Council (PMDC), World Health Organization (WHO), Medical Board of California (USA), and FAIMER (Foundation of Advancement of International Medical Education and Research).

Faculty of Legal Studies
The Hamdard School of Law, as a constituent institution of Hamdard University, opened for admission in January 2001, on the initiative of its former chancellor, Justice (R) Ajmal Mian, former Chief Justice of Pakistan and the then-Vice Chancellor. The Faculty of Legal Studies offers the degree of Bachelor of Laws (LL.B.) through the Hamdard School of Law which is in the vicinity of City Campus II (CC-II). Unlike most of the Pakistani institutions which offer the LL.B. courses in evening lecture sessions, the Hamdard School of Law offers a full-time semester-based course. Activities held during the three-year course include:

 Mock courts
 Court visits

 Visits to jails and care homes
 Visits to lawyers' chambers

In addition to success in the semester-wise examinations, students are required to complete the prescribed number of class hours for attaining the LL.B. degree. In order to fulfill its objectives of "providing and promoting study and research in the field of law and allied subjects", the following Boards were established:
 Advisory Board
 Executive Board

The executive board was entrusted to look after the administration and management of the school. The main function of the advisory board is to extend guidance to the Law School on policy matters with the prime objective of developing the Law School as a leading "Centre of Excellence of Law and Research" in the country and international recognition of the credentials, the degrees, and diplomas awarded. The teaching faculty of Hamdard School of Law consists of three professors, two associate professors, 18 assistant professors, and a lecturer.

Faculty of Pharmacy
The Faculty of Pharmacy was established in 1997. The faculty initially offered the following programs in its early phase (1997–2001):
 Doctor of Pharmacy (Pharm.D.)
 Doctor of Pharmacy (Pharm.D. – Condensed one-year Program)
 M.Phil. (Pharmacology & Clinical Practices)
 M.Phil. (Pharmaceutics)
 M.Phil. (Pharmacognosy)
 M.Phil. (Pharm. Chemistry)
 PhD (Pharmacology & Clinical Practices)
 PhD (Pharmaceutics)
 PhD (Pharmacognosy)
 PhD (Pharm. Chemistry)

In 2001, the Faculty of Pharmacy introduced an innovative B.Pharm., MBA program combining Pharmaceutical and Management Sciences for the first time in Pakistan. It has the support of two major faculties of the university: Pharmacy and Management Sciences.

Keeping in view the changing global trends and advances in pharmaceutical sciences, the Pharmacy Council of Pakistan and Higher Education Commission have upgraded the pharmacy syllabi and introduced an advanced program of Pharm.D. extending over five years. It is a professional doctoral program that is designed to prepare practitioners and researchers who can provide patient-oriented pharmaceutical care in contemporary settings including community practice and hospital environment.

In the light of the recommendation of the Pharmacy Council of Pakistan and Higher Education Commission, the Faculty of Pharmacy, Hamdard University, has adopted Pharm.D. as the basic degree in pharmacy.

HIPS – Karachi
Hamdard Institute of Pharmaceutical Sciences, Karachi offers a Doctor of Pharmacy (Pharm. D.) degree to the students who complete their five-year education from the institution. HIPS – Karachi provides education to the students in collaboration with Hamdard University Hospital, Taj Medical Complex (a 300-bed hospital), K.V. Social Security Hospital, SITE (a 335-bed hospital), and the 50-chair Hamdard Dental Hospital. The students work and gain experience in Pharmacy Stores, Pharmacies, Cardiac Care Unit, Intensive Care Unit, Emergency, General Medicine Ward, Blood Bank, and Laboratories. They are evaluated for attachment by the submission of projects, ward reports, and presentations.

The teaching faculty for HIPS – Karachi includes five professors, 10 assistant professors, and 11 lecturers.

HIPS – Islamabad
Hamdard Institute of Pharmaceutical Sciences, Islamabad offers its Pharm. D. degree in collaboration with Federal Government Services Hospital (FGSH) in Islamabad. This is a 508-bed hospital with over 500 doctors working in 27 specialities. The hospital has an average daily turnover of over 2000 patients. The students have the opportunity to interact and visit the 27 allied dispensaries attached to the hospital.

The teaching faculty for HIPS – Islamabad includes two professors, one associate professor, seven assistant professors, nine lecturers, and 11 teaching assistants. Laboratories for the campus includes a Basic Medical Sciences Laboratory, a Pharmaceutical Chemistry Laboratory, a Pharmaceutics Laboratory, a Pharmacognosy Laboratory, an Industrial Pharmacy Laboratory, and a Quality Control (QC) lab. Students are evaluated for attachment by the submission of projects, ward reports, and presentations.

Campus facilities

Student accommodation
 
For the undergraduate students of the Main Campus, Karachi, five hostels are provided. One girls' hostel and four boys' hostels serve as dormitories for the undergraduate students of the Faculty of Engineering Science and Technology, the Faculty of Easter Medicine, the Faculty of Management Sciences, and the Faculty of Health and Medical Sciences. The hostels in the vicinity of Main Campus, Madinat al-Hikmah are:
 A five-storey girls' hostel
 Two two-storey and one five-storey boys' hostel

To accommodate the increasing number of students, one extra building was acquired on lease in 2011. This dormitory serves as a boys' hostel and is in 4-K Chowrangi, North Karachi, which is about 14 kilometres from the Main Campus.
 A two-storey boys' hostel at 4-K Chowrangi, Karachi

Cafeteria
The Students-Teachers Centre (STC) is the central cafeteria of the main campus, which provides food and a facility for student-teacher interaction. Cafeterias and teashops are also on other campuses.

Transport
Transportation for students, faculty, and staff members between the Main Campus and different parts of the city is provided by a fleet of university-owned and on-contract vehicles which include buses, Coasters, HiAces, and mini-vans.

Libraries

Bait al-Hikmah

Bait al-Hikmah, named after the famous library, House of Wisdom in Baghdad, is the central library of Hamdard University's Main, Karachi Campus. It houses over half a million modern volumes as well as thousands of ancient manuscripts, millions of clippings, translations of Quran in over 60 languages, A.V. cassettes, as well as postage stamps, coins, and photographs of Hamdard University/Foundation activities, making it one of the largest libraries in South Asia.

The foundation-stone of Bait al-Hikmah was laid on 17 June 1985 by the then-President of the Islamic Republic of Pakistan, General Muhammad Zia-ul-Haq. It was established by Hakim Mohammed Said, the founder of Madinat al-Hikmah, a humanitarian and a philanthropist. After the completion of the Bait al-Hikmah as the first major and important institution of Madinat al-Hikmah, Hakim Said invited the then-President Ghulam Ishaq Khan to inaugurate the library on 11 December 1989.

The Bait al-Hikmah as a central library and center for academic research is used by students, faculties, researchers, scholars, and freelancers nationally and internationally. It is fully computerised.

The collection of Bait al-Hikmah Library ranges from books and journals covering Science and Technology, Medicine, Management Sciences, Indo-Pakistan History, Islam and Religion, Traditional/Alternative Systems of Medicine, Social Sciences and Jurisprudence, to Literature in Urdu, English, Arabic, and Persian.

Departmental libraries

Almost every institute of Hamdard University has a dedicated library which contains books related but not limited to that institute. These include:
 HIET Departmental Library, for the registered students and faculty of Hamdard Institute of Information Technology, Karachi. It houses books related to Information & Technology, Applied Sciences, and different engineering disciplines. A Book Bank is provided to the students of HIET through the same library.
 HIMS Departmental Library, for the registered students and faculty of Hamdard Institute of Management Sciences, Karachi
 HIESS Departmental Library, for the students and faculty of Hamdard Institute of Education & Social Sciences, Karachi
 Departmental Library of the Faculty of Eastern Medicine
 Departmental Library of the Faculty of Health and Medical Sciences
 Departmental Library of the Faculty of Legal Studies

Book Bank
Initiated in 2011, the Book Bank (available for the students of Hamdard Institute of Information Technology) provides students with reference- and text-books for a minimal fee of Rs. 50/book (equivalent to US$0.5) for the duration of a semester (which lasts for six months). Any student of HIET can register for the Book Bank free of cost and the registration remains effective for a maximum duration of four years (or until the completion of the degree in which the student is enrolled).

Student bodies and activities

FEST Student Body
It is the main functional student body of the Faculty of Engineering Sciences & Technology(FEST). The President and Vice President are Raja Hassan and Muhammad Ashar Aftab respectively.

IEEE HIET Student Branch
IEEE HIET Student Branch is a branch of the international organization, IEEE, which controls and monitors the student activities of IEEE members of HIET, Hamdard University. At IEEE platform, Saqib Munawwar Qureshi had study tours to India (JMI), Malaysia (IEEE Conference & Exhibition at UTAR), Singapore (Asia-Pacific Congress at NUS), and Sri Lanka (Seminar at UoM) with awards & honours during his undergraduate studies. HIET is the torchbearer among IEEE student branches under IEEE Karachi Section as the first SSR (Section Student Representative) was elected from HIET.

HIIT Literary and Cultural Society
HIIT Literary and Cultural Society (HLCS) is one of the functional student bodies of Hamdard Institute of Engineering and Technology. It organizes Book Fairs, Literary, and Cultural activities for students and faculty. The Founding Student Chair was Saqib Munawwar and Engr. Dr. Azhar Dilshad is presently serving as Faculty Coordinator.

IEEE GSESIT Student Branch
IEEE GSESIT (STB62211) Student Branch is a branch of the international organization, IEEE, which controls and monitors the student activities of IEEE members of GSESIT, Hamdard University. It was established to provide an international platform for research and innovation activities; Prof. Muhammad Shahab Siddiqui, Ph.D. was the chair and Counselor. In 2013 Engr. Saqib Munawwar became the chair and in 2015 he published 03 papers in ESSD at COMSATS Lahore. He also had a study tour to Ukraine which was acknowledged in the HEC News & Views October 2014 issue as News Flash and in the year 2013 he published 02 papers in WEC at NUST Islamabad.

Notable people

Faculty and staff
The renowned Pakistani scientist Abdul Qadeer Khan was Hamdard University's first registered professor of physics in Islamabad and once held the chairmanship of the Department of Physics.

Other prominent persons include Sadia Rashid, who is the chancellor of the university and the president of Hamdard Foundation Pakistan. Prof. Dr. Hakeem Abdul Hannan is the former vice chancellor and Prof. Dr. Vali Uddin is the acting registrar. They all are contributing a lot to improve the university standings.

Nazeer Ahmad, professor of physics at Hamdard University, earned his doctorate in physics (specialization in meteorology) under the supervision of Dr. Abdul Qadeer Khan and others.

Many scholars have produced cutting-edge research in their respective disciplines, including Islamic scholars Zakariyau Oseni, Zulkadir Siddiqui, historian Mohammad Ishaq Khan, and economist Matin Ahmed Khan. Other faculty members include Sarwar Munir Rao (Mass Communication), electrical engineer Atta-ur-Rehman Memon, and Zillur Rahman (who has been serving as visiting professor of medicine since 1997).

See also
 Jamia Hamdard
 Hamdard University Bangladesh
 Hamdard Public College
 Hamdard Public School

References

External links

 
Engineering universities and colleges in Pakistan
Medical colleges in Sindh
Private universities and colleges in Sindh
1991 establishments in Pakistan